Chrysolina hyperici, the Saint John's Wort Beetle is a species of beetles of the family Chrysomelidae.

Life cycle

The species lays up to 2.000 eggs on the host plant during the fall. Larvae emerge in the spring. They spend the winter as adults or eggs.

Distribution 
Originally distributed in Europa and Asia, it has been introduced in other places as biological control of Hypericum perforatum.

References 

Chrysomelinae
Biological pest control
Beetles described in 1771
Taxa named by Johann Reinhold Forster